Emil Paul Scheibe (September 1, 1861 – December 28, 1910) was an American politician and brewer.

Born in Manitowoc, Wisconsin, Scheibe moved to the town of Centerville, Manitowoc County, Wisconsin in 1867. Scheibe was a brewer. In 1889, Scheibe served in the Wisconsin State Assembly and was a Democrat. His post office box was: Hika, Wisconsin in Manitowoc County. Scheibe then moved to Marshfield, Wisconsin and was one of the founders of the Marshfield Brewing Company. Scheibe served on the Marshfield Common Council in 1895, 1898, and 1899. Scheibe died at his home in Marshfield, Wisconsin after a long illness.

Notes

1861 births
1910 deaths
People from Manitowoc, Wisconsin
People from Marshfield, Wisconsin
Businesspeople from Wisconsin
American brewers
Wisconsin city council members
19th-century American politicians
People from Centerville, Manitowoc County, Wisconsin
19th-century American businesspeople
Democratic Party members of the Wisconsin State Assembly